"Circus" is a song recorded by South Korean boy band Stray Kids. It appears as the first track on their second Japanese-language extended play (EP) of the same name. The song was released on June 10, 2022, through Epic Records Japan, as the third and lead single of the EP after the Japanese version of "Maniac", and "Your Eyes". The Korean version was included on their seventh Korean-language EP Maxident.

Release and composition

Stray Kids' second Japanese-language extended play (EP), was announced on April 4, 2022. Later the title Circus and track listing were revealed on May 16, including the first track of the same name, "Circus". The song was released to digital music and streaming platforms on June 10, in conjunction with its accomapying music video premiere. The Korean version of the song was included on the group's seventh Korean-language EP Maxident, scheduled for release on October 7.

"Circus" is a hip hop-dance song written by Stray Kids' in-house production team, 3Racha, with Earattack, Chan's and Darm, composed in the key of F minor, 98 beats per minute with a running time of three minutes and fourteen seconds. The song centered on the circus theme, featuring word playing, "vaulting" pluck bass, "addictive" vocal chops, and "solid" drums, which make sounds like "elephant footsteps in the circus".

Commercial performance

"Circus" entered the Billboard Japan Hot 100 in the chart issue dated June 15, 2022, at number 96 and ascended to number 47 on the next week. On its component charts, the song peaked at number 81 on the Download Chart, and number 27 on the Streaming Songs. The song landed at number 43 on the Oricon Combined Singles Chart. Internationally, "Circus" entered the RMNZ Hot Singles Chart at number 29. The Korean version debuted at number 34 on the Circle Download Chart.

Music video

An accompanying music video for "Circus", directed by Bang Jae-yeob, was premiered alongside the single release on June 10, 2022, preceded by two teasers. The music video depicts Stray Kids members performing in a circus tent with real circus performers. The members are divided into two circuses, and 16 members, using compositing technology.

Live performances

Stray Kids gave the debut performance of "Circus" on June 11, 2022, at their first show of Maniac World Tour in Japan at World Memorial Hall, Kobe. The group also appeared on the morning show Sukkiri on June 14 to give an interview and perform the song. The group performed "Circus" at Buzz Rhythm 02 on July 9, alongside "Back Door", the two-hour special episode of Music Station on August 5, and Best Artist 2022 on December 3, along with "Maniac". The Korean version was performed for the first time their "Seoul Special (Unveil 11)" of Maniac World Tour on September 17, as well as the 2022 MBC Gayo Daejejeon alongside "Case 143" on January 1, 2023.

Credits and personnel

Personnel
 Stray Kids – vocals, background vocals
 Bang Chan (3Racha) – lyrics, composition, all instruments, computer programming, vocal directing, digital editing
 Changbin (3Racha) – lyrics, composition, vocal directing
 Han (3Racha) – lyrics, composition, vocal directing
 KM-Markit – Japanese lyrics
 Earattack – background vocals, composition, arrangement, all instruments, computer programming, vocal directing
 Chan's – composition, arrangement, all instruments, computer programming
 Darm – composition, arrangement, all instruments, computer programming
 Goo Hye-jin – recording
 Lee Kyeong-won – digital editing
 Lee Tae-sub – mixing
 Kwon Nam-woo – mastering

Locations
 Sony Music Publishing (Japan) Inc. – publishing
 JYP Publishing (KOMCA) – publishing
 Music Cube Inc. – publishing
 Cube Entertainment Inc. – publishing
 Fujipacific Music Korea Inc. – publishing
 JYPE Studios – recording, mixing
 KayOne Sounds – digital editing
 821 Sound Mastering – mastering

Charts

Release history

References

2022 singles
2022 songs
Japanese-language songs
Korean-language songs
Sony Music Entertainment Japan singles
Stray Kids songs